Shalini Kapoor (हिन्दी - शालिनी कपूर)  is an innovator and chief technology officer for IBM AI Application.

Early life and education 
Shalini was born and raised in India, growing up in the city of Bareilly in Uttar Pradesh. She earned a Bachelor of Technology in Computer Science from the University of Lucknow's Institute of Engineering and Technology. Afterwards, she went on to attend S. P. Jain Institute of Management and Research, where she acquired a Master of Business Administration in Information Systems.

Career 
Shalini started her career with HCL, where she developed systems and software for several public sector and distribution clients. After three years, she joined IBM Software Labs as a solution architect, working on analytics, consulting, and large-scale business infrastructure projects, and she stayed at IBM until present day. Currently, Shalini is IBM's Chief Technical Officer in AI Application, leading the AI Infusion and skills transformation initiatives. She is responsible for building, managing, and scaling IBM's AI portfolio, as well as driving the company's technology strategy. Shalini has led several large-scale transformation initiatives, including the expansion of IBM's AI capabilities to meet growing industry demand, and the acquisition of several talent-transformative companies. Shalini is responsible for planning and development of IBM workloads, services, and platforms that enable clients to achieve their business goals. She is a torchbearer of Good Tech IBM projects in India. These include efforts to use technology responsibility and virtuously, spreading it to fields such as disaster relief, education, and other areas of concern. Due to her work, she is the became the first woman IBM Fellow in India.

In addition, Kapoor has also focused on spreading technology to both underrepresented and inexperienced groups. Shalini has also presented at conferences and industry meetups to inspire others to follow their passion. Shalini is passionate about women in technology, and is a strong advocate for encouraging girls to pursue careers in STEM. She also founded the Ankurit Foundation, a non-profit organization that facilitates the early adoption and education of technology and innovation within children. Shalini is passionate about supporting education, and works closely with STEM teachers to provide resources and professional development for their students. The foundation has also brought technology to classrooms, libraries and community centers, so that underrepresented children can learn and grow with technology.

Patents 
With the rapid rise of internet devices within the past few decades, there is also a need for systems that support and manage connections between devices. As such, the necessity to improve on the foundation behind these structures drove Shalini to create her own solutions. Over the past decade, she has filed for many patents relating to the Internet of Things, data storage and transmission, mobile security, and other related technologies. Shalini's patents will expand the scope of the Internet of Things and enable new products and services which would not have otherwise been possible. Her work has increased the speed and efficiency of technology implementation across many lives and has the potential to change the way people live and work, facilitating the improvement and implementation of smart cities, homes, and communities. Shalini's ideas have helped thousands of companies and individuals to build the next generation of digital products and services.

Awards and recognitions 

 Emerging Women Achiever's award from the Confederation of Indian Industry
 Zinnov Technical Role Model Award in 2012
 Woman in Technology award from eMERG India in 2015
 Nominee for Economic Times Prime Technical Leader of the Year 2020

References 

American women computer scientists
American computer scientists
IBM Fellows
IBM Research computer scientists
Living people
Year of birth missing (living people)
21st-century American women
Women educators
Computer scientists
Women in computing
IBM employees
IBM Women